The prime minister of the Netherlands is the head of the executive branch of the Government of the Netherlands. Although the monarch is the de jure head of government, the prime minister de facto occupies this role as the officeholder chairs the Council of Ministers and coordinates its policy with the rest of the cabinet. The current prime minister has been Mark Rutte since 14 October 2010, whose fourth cabinet was inaugurated on 10 January 2022.

History 
Gradually the prime minister became an official function of government leader, taken by the political leader of the largest party. Since 1845, the role of the first minister is relevant. In that year the Constitution of the Netherlands was amended to make ministers responsible to the States General and no longer responsible to the king, who acted as the leader of cabinet. Until 1901, the position chair of the Council of Ministers officially rotated between ministers. Between 1901 and 1945, the position formally still rotated, but prominent politicians could claim a rotation period of four years.

In 1937, a separate Ministry of General Affairs was instituted, which was informally linked to the prime minister. Barend Biesheuvel (1971–1974) was the last prime minister who was not the political leader of the largest party in cabinet; his was actually the third largest. In 1983 the function of prime minister was laid down in the constitution.

The position of the prime minister has been enforced by the creation of the European Council. In November 2006, the rules of procedure of the council of ministers was changed to allow the prime minister to put any item on the agenda of the council and longer have to wait for a minister to take the initiative. A change of the rules of procedure of the cabinet in July 2008 allowed the prime minister to direct other ministers on the costs of the Royal House, which are covered by several ministries.

Role 
Although the prime minister is the leading Dutch political figure and holder of the de facto highest office, they are not quite as powerful as the British prime minister and the German chancellor. This is mainly because, historically, all Dutch ministers used to be responsible to the monarch; ministers took turns to fill the position of prime minister, and in the role had little if any control over the other ministers. The prime minister's role gained importance when ministers became responsible to the parliament, and the position became mostly reserved for the leader of the biggest political party in the House of Representatives. Still, because the position holds limited powers compared to its equivalent in other neighboring parliamentary democracies, the prime minister's role is described as primus inter pares ("first among equals").

Following the constitutional review of 1983, the position of prime minister was formalised in the Dutch Constitution for the first time. According to the Constitution of the Netherlands, the Government is constituted by the king and the ministers. The Constitution stipulates that the prime minister chairs the Council of Ministers (article 45) and is appointed by royal decree (article 43). The royal decree of their own appointment and those of the other ministers are to be countersigned by the prime minister (article 48). The Council of Ministers is no longer nowadays attended by the king.

The prime minister chairs the weekly meetings of the Council of Ministers and has the power to set the agenda of these meetings. The prime minister is also Minister of General Affairs (Minister van Algemene Zaken), which takes an important role in coordinating policy and is responsible for the Government Information Service (Dutch: Rijksvoorlichtingsdienst).

The prime minister is also responsible for the royal house and has a weekly meeting with the king on government policy. Informally the prime minister functions as the "face" of the cabinet to the public. After the meetings of the cabinet on Friday, the prime minister hosts a press conference on the decisions of the cabinet and current affairs. The prime minister also has some functions in international affairs, attending the European Council every six months and maintaining bilateral contacts. The prime minister's office is a hexagon shaped tower, named "The Little Tower" (Torentje), in the Binnenhof in The Hague. The official residence (which is only used for official functions) is the Catshuis; the last prime minister to live in the Catshuis was Dries van Agt. Incumbent Mark Rutte lives in a flat in downtown The Hague. The prime minister has a security detail and in 2021, his security protection was increased amid fears of kidnapping.

Although the prime minister is almost always the political leader of his party and a member of the House of Representatives, he is required to give up his seat for the duration of his tenure, as Dutch ministers are not allowed to be members of parliament.

Appointment 

The Dutch electoral system makes it all but impossible for one party to win an outright majority in the House of Representatives; no party has done so since 1900. Hence, Dutch governments are always coalitions between two or more parties. After each election, the House appoints a "scout" to seek advice on how to interpret the election results. On the basis of this advice, the House appoints an informateur to check on prospective coalitions and lead negotiations between potential partners. If successful, the House then appoints a formateur, who concludes the talks between the members of the prospective coalition. The formateur is almost always the leader of the largest party in the prospective coalition, and thus de facto prime minister-designate. Prior to 2012, the monarch had a considerable role in these talks, but reforms in 2012 largely eliminated royal influence on the process.

It usually takes several months of negotiations before a formateur is ready to accept a formal royal invitation to form a government. The monarch then appoints the ministers and state secretaries (junior ministers), who then resign their seats in the House.

A minister from the smaller coalition party usually becomes Deputy Prime Minister of the Netherlands. If there is a third or fourth party in the coalition, each has the right to name one of its ministers second and third deputy prime minister.

Deputies 

The king appoints deputy prime ministers. Conventionally, all of the junior partners in the coalition get one deputy prime minister; they are ranked according to the size of their respective parties. The senior deputy present chairs the cabinet meeting when the prime minister is not present. In the current Fourth Rutte cabinet, Sigrid Kaag chairs those meetings as first deputy prime minister of the Netherlands, with the other deputies being Wopke Hoekstra and Carola Schouten. The oldest member of the cabinet chairs the meeting when the prime minister and all deputies are absent.

Kingdom of the Netherlands 
The prime minister is also chairman of the Council of Ministers of the Kingdom of the Netherlands, and therefore also deals with matters affecting the other countries Aruba, Curaçao, and Sint Maarten in the kingdom. The independent cabinets of Aruba, Curaçao, and Sint Maarten also have their own prime ministers: Evelyn Wever-Croes (Prime Minister of Aruba), Gilmar Pisas (Prime Minister of Curaçao), and Silveria Jacobs (Prime Minister of Sint Maarten). The Council of Ministers of the Kingdom of the Netherlands includes ministers plenipotentiary from the other countries of the kingdom. These are not included in the government of the kingdom.

See also 
 Historical rankings of prime ministers of the Netherlands
 List of prime ministers of the Netherlands by education
 Religious affiliations of prime ministers of the Netherlands

Footnotes 

 
1848 establishments in the Netherlands
Dutch political institutions
Political history of the Netherlands